This is a list of seasons completed by the Maine Black Bears football team, which represents the University of Maine of Orono, Maine, in intercollegiate football in the United States.

Seasons

References

Maine

Maine Black Bears